Enrique Serrano (1891–1965) was an Argentine actor and comedian in the 1940s and 1950s.

He appeared in many films of the 1940s and 1950s including Muchachas que estudian, Asi es la vida (1939).
He starred in some 40 films between 1935 and 1964.

Films

 1916 Hasta después de muerta ('Til After Her Death)
 1935 Noches de Buenos Aires (Buenos Aires Nights)
 1935 El caballo del pueblo (The Favorite, as Bebe Viñas)
 1935 The Soul of the Accordion (as Enrique)
 1938 Jettatore
 1938 La rubia del camino (as Count Ugolino Malipieri)
 1938 Three Argentines in Paris (as Eleodoro López)
 1939 Muchachas que estudian (College Girls, as Professor Castro)
 1939 Divorce in Montevideo (as Goyena)
 1939 El solterón
 1939 Such Is Life (as Sr. Barreiro)
 1940 Los muchachos se divierten
 1940 Honeymoon in Rio (as Goyena)
 1940 Marriage in Buenos Aires (as Goyena)
 1940 Medio millón por una mujer
 1941 Los martes, orquídeas (On Tuesdays, Orchids)
 1941 Un bebé de París (as Andrés)
 1942 El pijama de Adán (as Don Lucas)
 1942 Locos de verano
 1942 Noche de bodas (The Wedding Night)
 1943 Daughter of the Minister
 1945 Rigoberto
 1946 Adán y la serpiente
 1946 Deshojando margaritas
 1946 No salgas esta noche
 1948 La locura de Don Juan
 1948 Novio, marido y amante
 1949 Miguitas en la cama
 1949 Un hombre solo no vale nada
 1950 Don Fulgencio (as Don Fulgencio)
 1950 ¿Vendrás a media noche?
 1951 El complejo de Felipe
 1951 La calle junto a la luna
 1951 Martín pescador
 1954 El Calavera
 1956 Bendita seas (as Aniceto)
 1956 El tango en París
 1957 Mi marido y mi padrino (TV Series)
 1960 Yo quiero vivir contigo
 1963 The Games Men Play (as Musician)
 1964 Cuidado con las colas

External links
 

1891 births
1965 deaths
People from Buenos Aires
Argentine male film actors
Argentine comedians
Burials at La Chacarita Cemetery
20th-century comedians